A portable bicycle is a bicycle that has been designed to be small and light enough for easy carrying. It is usually dismantled to make a convenient bundle and the frame often has a folding action to facilitate this. The design of a portable bicycle involves a trade-off between ease of carrying and ease of riding.

History
The first popular bicycles were the large penny-farthings. The pioneering inventor, W. H. J. Grout of Stoke Newington, invented a portable version in which the large front wheel could be dismantled into four pieces so that they would fit into a carrying bag.

In the 1890s, Captain Gérard of the 87th Regiment of French Infantry was an advocate of bicycles for military use. To enable his troops to operate in rough terrain, he devised a bicycle which could be folded in two and carried on the soldiers' backs; the weight was "between 22 and 26¼ lbs" (10–12 kg). The first time the Gérard portable bicycle was used, it "gave complete satisfaction and justified all expectations". The bicycles were manufactured by Charles Morel who commercialised the type.

In 1919, Charles Haskell Clark of New York City filed a patent (granted in 1921) (patent US1381281) for a portable bicycle that was easy to carry onto trains or street cars. Additional advantages of small wheels, described in the patent, were the reduced interference with skirts and the ability to dodge in and out among the crowd. The December 1919 issue of Scientific American had an article describing Mr. Clark's "city bicycle".

Riding performance 
The riding performance of portable bicycles is challenged by the need to make the bike as small and as light as possible. Rider body weight and size, and road conditions have a strong impact on design and on performance. Typically, portable bicycles intended for the East Asia market (China, Japan, Korea, Taiwan, ...) can be designed for riders lighter than 80 kg and shorter than 174 cm. Northern Europe and America require designs for riders up to 120 kg and 200 cm. City roads are generally smoother in Asian cities, but the bicycle has to be able to ride in crowded city sidewalks. Many European city streets are paved with cobblestone, so portable bicycles marketed in Europe need to cope with such a pavement. The smaller the diameter of a bicycle wheel, the higher the rolling friction and the rougher the ride, which is a challenge for portable bicycles as well as for kick scooters. New technological solutions are being studied to offer the same rolling friction at smaller wheel diameters.

Carrying and folding 
The point at which a folding bicycle can be considered a portable bicycle is not precisely defined, and depends on the user. A benchmark for portability are the Brompton Bicycles, medium-size bicycles that fold well and are the world's most numerous built on a single design. A bicycle easier to carry than the Brompton C3 can be considered portable.

Many portable bicycles weigh below 6 kg and fold in less than 20 seconds. Above these figures the risk is that the bicycle is too heavy for easy carrying, or takes an inconveniently long time to fold. Folding and unfolding has to be easier than is needed for ordinary full-size folding bicycles, because portable bicycles are used for shorter trips than full-size folding bikes.

Use 
Frequent uses for a portable bicycle include:
 last mile scooting from a far away parking lot
 city district riding
 subway or bus station shuttle
 family fun
 pit bike
 short distance travel

Bicycles can reduce fossil fuel emissions by shortening or eliminating car trips, and by extending the reach of public transportation as part of a mixed-mode commute. Portable bicycles often can be used also by children and so can be kept for a lifetime.

List of portable bicycles, commercially available (present and past) 
Many portable bicycles are or have been commercially available; they include:

 A-bike
 Mini125
 BikeaPack
 Bickerton portable
 Carry-Me
 Handybike
 Handybike 8
 Zero Bike
 Bridgestone
 Transit Compact
 Transit Super Lite
 Frog
 Kahenseki
 Koma
 Kallima
 Cocolofoo CB-2E
 Moulton
 17bicycle EX Walker
 Panasonic Traincle 6500, 7500
 Strida
 Skoot
 Bike Friday (Oregon)
 Alessandro Belli Bike
 Piccolino, UGO
 Vikkino P
 Cherubim Ultramini
 JD Bike RB300, R100
 Giatex
 Mobiky

See also 
 Kick scooter
 Outline of cycling
 Small wheel bike

References

External links 
 cafe.daum.net/MINIVELO
 5 of the best folding bikes
 The 10 Best folding bikes

 Portable bicycle

de:Faltrad
it:Bicicletta pieghevole
nl:Vouwfiets
ja:折り畳み自転車
pl:Rower składany
sv:Hopfällbar cykel
zh:折叠车